Bernaya is a genus of sea snails or cowries, marine gastropod mollusks in the family Cypraeidae, the cowries.

Species
Species within the genus Bernaya include:

 Bernaya crawfordactei (extinct/fossil) 
 Bernaya fultoni (Sow.): synonym of Barycypraea fultoni (Sowerby III, 1903)
 Bernaya teulerei Caz.: synonym of Barycypraea teulerei (Cazenavette, 1846)

References

Cypraeidae